John W. Greig (born April 28, 1961 in Sacramento, California) is a retired American basketball player, formerly in the National Basketball Association (NBA). A 6'7" (2.01 m) and 210 lb (95 kg) small forward, Greig played competitively at Timberline High School in Lacey, Washington and played college basketball at Wenatchee Valley Community College and at the University of Oregon.

Greig was selected in the third round of the 1982 NBA Draft (65th overall) by the Seattle SuperSonics but played only nine games for them in the 1982–83 season, averaging 2.1 points and 0.7 rebounds per game. He also played professionally in Switzerland, France and Spain.

Presently Greig resides in Sammamish in Seattle, Washington and is a sports agent. In the past he has represented Ruben Douglas, the fifth-leading scorer in New Mexico Lobos men's basketball history, former NBA player Pops Mensah-Bonsu, and more recently he represents Sacramento Kings forward DeMarcus Cousins.

Notes

External links
College & NBA stats @ basketballreference.com

1961 births
Living people
American expatriate basketball people in France
American expatriate basketball people in Spain
American expatriate basketball people in Switzerland
American men's basketball players
American sports agents
Basketball players from Sacramento, California
Junior college men's basketball players in the United States
Oregon Ducks men's basketball players
People from Sammamish, Washington
Basketball players from Seattle
Seattle SuperSonics draft picks
Seattle SuperSonics players
Small forwards